HMAS Acute (P 81) was an  operated by the Royal Australian Navy (RAN).

Design and construction

The Attack class was ordered in 1964 to operate in Australian waters as patrol boats (based on lessons learned through using the s on patrols of Borneo during the Indonesia-Malaysia Confrontation, and to replace a variety of old patrol, search-and-rescue, and general-purpose craft. Initially, nine were ordered for the RAN, with another five for Papua New Guinea's Australian-run coastal security force, although another six ships were ordered to bring the class to twenty vessels. Propulsion machinery consisted of two 16-cylinder Paxman YJCM diesel engines, which supplied  to the two propellers. The ship's company consisted of three officers and sixteen sailors. Main armament was a bow-mounted Bofors 40 mm gun, supplemented by two .50-calibre M2 Browning machine guns and various small arms. The ships were designed with as many commercial components as possible: the Attacks were to operate in remote regions of Australia and New Guinea, and a town's hardware store would be more accessible than home base in a mechanical emergency.

Acute was laid down by Evans Deakin and Company at Brisbane, launched on 26 August 1967, and commissioned on 26 April 1968.

Operational history
Acute was predominantly used for training of Royal Australian Navy Reserve personnel at Fremantle, Western Australia. Before the Two Ocean Policy was completely implemented, the patrol boat was for several years the only warship assigned to Western Australia (with the nickname "The Lone Gun of the West Coast"), and responsible for patrolling an area extending from Albany to Broome. Whilst on a training cruise in May 1983, Acute apprehended two Taiwanese fishing boats engaged in illegal fishing. This was the first such operation involving RANR personnel.

Acute paid off on 6 May 1983. She was transferred to the Indonesian Navy and renamed Silea. The patrol boat was listed in Jane's Fighting Ships as still operational in 2011.

Citations

References

Books

News articles

Online sources

External links
 Royal Australian Navy webpage for HMAS Acute

Attack-class patrol boats
1967 ships